Hato Viejo may refer to:

 Hato Viejo, Arecibo, Puerto Rico, a barrio
 Hato Viejo, Ciales, Puerto Rico, a barrio
 Hato Viejo, Dominican Republic, a municipal district in San Antonio de Guerra, Santo Domingo Province